{{DISPLAYTITLE:Glycerol-3-phosphate 1-dehydrogenase (NADP+)}}

In enzymology, a glycerol-3-phosphate 1-dehydrogenase (NADP+) is an enzyme that catalyzes the chemical reaction

sn-glycerol 3-phosphate + NADP+  D-glyceraldehyde 3-phosphate + NADPH + H+

Thus, the two substrates of this enzyme are sn-glycerol 3-phosphate and NADP+, whereas its 3 products are D-glyceraldehyde 3-phosphate, NADPH, and H+.

This enzyme belongs to the family of oxidoreductases, specifically those acting on the CH-OH group of donor with NAD+ or NADP+ as acceptor. The systematic name of this enzyme class is sn-glycerol-3-phosphate:NADP+ 1-oxidoreductase. Other names in common use include glycerol phosphate (nicotinamide adenine dinucleotide phosphate), dehydrogenase, L-glycerol 3-phosphate:NADP+ oxidoreductase, glycerin-3-phosphate dehydrogenase, NADPH-dependent glycerin-3-phosphate dehydrogenase, and glycerol-3-phosphate 1-dehydrogenase (NADP+).

References

 
 

EC 1.1.1
NADPH-dependent enzymes
Enzymes of unknown structure